Niclas Castello (real name Norbert Zerbs, born 1978 in Neuhaus am Rennweg) is a German contemporary artist.

Life and career 
Niclas Castello grew up in Neuhaus am Rennweg, East Germany. After living in Montmartre, Paris, he moved back to Germany in 2003, where he studied art at a private university, dropping out after two years. Castello then moved to New York City, where he was supported by Arleen Schloss, staying at Schloss' New York loft for about two years. From 2008 to 2015, he traveled and worked with galleries in Europe and the United States. 

Castello has described the artist Invader as an influence. Castello's work includes a sculpture series titled The Kiss sculptures, and artwork depicting fire extinguishers.

Castello married Sylvie Meis, a Dutch TV personality and ex of Football player Rafael van der Vaart on September 19, 2020 in Florence Italy.

References

External links 

 official website of Niclas Castello
 Niclas Castello on Lipsia Fine Arts

1978 births
German contemporary artists
Living people
German pop artists
Street artists